This is a list of electricity-generating power stations in the U.S. state of Mississippi, sorted by type and name. In 2019, Mississippi had a total summer capacity of 14,541 MW through all of its power plants, and a net generation of 65,959 GWh.   The corresponding electrical energy generation mix was 74.0% natural gas, 16.7% nuclear, 6.7% coal, 2.1% biomass, and 0.5% solar.

Nuclear power plants

Fossil-fuel power plants

Coal

Natural gas

Renewable power plants
Data from the U.S. Energy Information Administration.

Biomass and municipal waste

Solar

See also

List of power stations in the United States
List of power stations operated by the Tennessee Valley Authority

References

Mississippi
Power stations

Power stations